Lorenzo Geyres is a village in Paysandú Department of western Uruguay.

Geography

History
A nucleus of houses near the railroad station Queguay became recognized as a village named "Queguay" by the Act of Ley Nº 333 on 6 July 1853. It was renamed to "Lorenzo Geyres" and its status was elevated to "Pueblo" (village) by the Act of Ley Nº 8.226 on 29 May 1928.

Population
In 2011 Lorenzo Geyres had a population of 774.
 
Source: Instituto Nacional de Estadística de Uruguay

References

External links
INE map of Lorenzo Geyres

Populated places in the Paysandú Department